Acmella pilosa, the hairy spotflower, is a Mesoamerican species of flowering plants in the family Asteraceae. It is native to Guatemala, Belize, and southeastern Mexico (Campeche, Quintana Roo, Tabasco). The species is also naturalized in the southern part of the US State of Florida.

References 

pilosa
Flora of Central America
Flora of Mexico
Plants described in 1985